Trent is a municipality in the Vorpommern-Rügen district, in Mecklenburg-Vorpommern, Germany.

Geography 

Trent lies in the northwest of Muttland on the German Baltic Sea island of Rügen, about 17 kilometres northwest of the town of Bergen auf Rügen. The municipality is bounded in the north by the lagoons of the Wieker Bodden and Breetzer Bodden and in the east by the Neuendorfer Wiek bay. A small part of the parish borders on the village of Freesen on the Udarser Wiek.

Trent lies on the old historic trade route, the Herring Road (Heringsstraße), that ran from Stralsund to the peninsula of Halbinsel Wittow.

Subdivisions 
The following villages belong to Trent: Fischersiedlung, Freesen, Ganschvitz, Grosow, Holstenhagen, Jabelitz, Libnitz, Trent, Tribkevitz, Vaschvitz, Venz and Zubzow.

References

External links

Official website of Trent on Rügen Island

Towns and villages on Rügen